Vishwas Gangurde is an Indian politician and member of the Bharatiya Janata Party. Gangurde is a first term member of the Maharashtra Legislative Assembly in 1999 from the  Parvati constituency assembly constituency in Pune.

References 

Politicians from Pune
Bharatiya Janata Party politicians from Maharashtra
Members of the Maharashtra Legislative Assembly
Living people
Marathi politicians
Year of birth missing (living people)